Barsuk Records is an independent record label based in Seattle, Washington. It was established in 1998 by members of the band This Busy Monster, originally to publish their own material. Since that time they have published between 3 and 15 titles each year, from a number of different artists. Titles are released primarily in vinyl, CD, cassette, and digital formats.

Note
Some of the recording artists mentioned in this list are no longer signed by Barsuk, including Death Cab For Cutie, Rilo Kiley and Smoosh. Death Cab For Cutie have signed to the major label Atlantic Records, but continue to release vinyl versions of their records through Barsuk.

See also
 Barsuk Records

External links
Barsuk Records website
AllMusic

Discographies of American record labels
Rock music discographies